Celestica Inc. is a Canadian multinational design, manufacturing, hardware platform, and supply chain electronics manufacturing services (EMS) company headquartered in Toronto, Ontario. The company operates in 50 sites across 15 countries.

History 
Celestica was incorporated in 1994 as a subsidiary of IBM.  In 1996, it was sold off to Onex Corporation.
In April 2001, the company announced it was laying off 3,000 people, about 10% of its workforce, due to the dot-com crash. Losses mounted and on 29 January 2004 the company announced that company CEO Eugene Polistuk would be retiring. In April 2004, Stephen Delaney took over as CEO in a temporary capacity.

CEO Craig Muhlhauser announced his retirement in October 2014. Rob Mionis took over for him on 1 August 2015.

References

Notes

Bibliography 
 David Einstein, "Top Tech Execs: Eugene Polistuk", Forbes, 12 December 2000
 Robert McGarvey, "Outsourcers Rise Again", Upside, February 2000

Companies listed on the New York Stock Exchange
Companies listed on the Toronto Stock Exchange
Electronics companies of Canada
Manufacturing companies based in Toronto
Canadian companies established in 1994
Electronics companies established in 1994
Multinational companies headquartered in Canada
1998 initial public offerings
Onex Corporation